The Master of the Osservanza Triptych, also known as the Osservanza Master and as the Master of Osservanza, is the name given to an Italian painter of the Sienese School active about 1430 to 1450.

The Italian scholar Roberto Longhi recognized that two triptychs formerly attributed to Stefano di Giovanni (il Sassetta) were the work of another hand, now generally referred to as the Master of the Osservanza Triptych.  The Virgin and Child with St. Jerome and St. Ambrose (Basilica dell'Osservanza, Siena) and the Birth of the Virgin (Museo d'Arte Sacra, Asciano) are both stylistically similar to the work of Stefano di Giovanni, but have a narrative expression that is characteristic of Late Gothic painting.

Longhi observed that another group of paintings was closely related to these works and appeared to be by the same hand.  These included the predella of the Osservanza Altarpiece (Pinacoteca Nazionale, Siena), a predella of St. Bartholomew (Pinacoteca Nazionale, Siena), Scenes of the Passion (Vatican Museums, Philadelphia Museum of Art, and Fogg Art Museum), the Resurrection (Detroit Institute of Arts),  and Scenes from the Life of St. Anthony Abbot (panels in the National Gallery of Art, Washington D. C., the Metropolitan Museum of Art, the Yale University Art Museum and Museum Wiesbaden, Germany). Additionally, the full-length painting of St. Anthony Abbot in the Louvre appears to be from another altarpiece by the same master.

Research in 2010 by Maria Falcone in Siena has revealed the name of the Master to be Sano di Pietro.  Falcone found a document about an altarpiece by the “Master of Osservanza” for a church in Asciano, just outside Siena, which was actually under the bishopric of Arezzo. The priest of the church in Asciano did not pay the painter and therefore the city government of Siena had to make an appeal to the bishop in Arezzo to force the priest from his district to pay the artist. The artist's name was included on the document as Sano di Pietro.

Gallery

References
 Carli, Enzo, Sassetta e il Maestro dell'Osservanza. (I Sommi dell'Arte Italiana), Milano, Aldo Martello, 1957. 
 Fredericksen, Burton and Federico Zeri, Census of Pre-Nineteenth-Century Italian Paintings in North American Public Collections, Cambridge, Harvard University Press, 1972.
 Witt Library, A checklist of painters c. 1200-1976 represented in the Witt Library, Courtauld Institute of Art, London, London, Mansell Information Publishing, 1978.
 Maria Falcone, “La giovinezza dorata di Sano di Pietro: Un nuovo document per la ‘Natività della Vergine’ di Asciano”, Prospettiva, n. 138, April 2010, pp. 28–34.

Further reading
 (see index; plate 44-45)

External links

 Master of the Osservanza Triptych in ArtCyclopedia
 Master of the Osservanza Triptych Podere Santa Pia



15th-century Italian painters
Painters from Siena
Osservanza Triptych, Master of the